USS LSM-110 was a  in the United States Navy during World War II. The ship was transferred to France as L9012, South Vietnam as RVNS Hàn Giang (HQ-401) and Philippines to be cannibalized for spare parts.

Construction and career 
LSM-110 was laid down on 7 October 1944 at Brown Shipbuilding Co., Houston, Texas. Launched on 28 October 1944 and commissioned on 25 November 1944.

During World War II, LSM-110 was assigned to the Asiatic-Pacific theater.

LSM-110 was decommissioned on 2 January 1947 and was in service for Naval Reserve training. She was recommissioned on 19 September 1950 amid the Korean War. The ship took part in the U.N. Summer-Fall Offensive from 1 to 31 October 1952, Korean Defense Summer-Fall 1952 from 26 September to 20 December 1952 and the Third Korean Winter from 10 December 1952 to 9 February 1953.

She was loaned to the French on 22 January 1954.

She was struck from the Navy Register.

The ship was commissioned into the French Navy on 28 June 1954 and renamed L9012.

L9012 was then transferred to South Vietnam in October 1955 and commissioned in December, later that year as RVNS Hàn Giang (HQ-401). The ship was used as a hospital ship during the Vietnam War.  She was very nearly swamped by hundreds of civilians who swarmed aboard her at Stone Pier during the April 1975 fall of Nha Trang. Several people were trampled to death or drowned after being pushed into the water.  The Hàn Giang captain, feeling the ship begin to list, had to back it away from the pier. The local naval commander refused to allow any more of his ships to dock and risk being lost so ordered his vessels to sail for Cam Ranh.

During the fall of Vietnam, she escaped and interned into the Philippines in May 1975 and later acquired by the Philippine Navy on 17 November 1975 to be used as spare parts.

She was scrapped on 9 June 1976 by Santiago A. Gerrero, Olongapo City.

Awards 
LST-110 have earned the following awards:

American Campaign Medal
Asiatic-Pacific Campaign Medal
World War II Victory Medal 
National Defense Service Medal 
Korean Service Medal (3 battle stars)  
United Nations Service Medal  
Republic of Korea War Service Medal

Citations

Sources 
 
 
 
 

World War II amphibious warfare vessels of the United States
Ships built in Houston
1944 ships
LSM-1-class landing ships medium
Ships transferred from the United States Navy to the French Navy
Ships transferred from the United States Navy to the Republic of Vietnam Navy
Ships transferred from the United States Navy to the Philippine Navy